Long Remirang is a settlement in Lawas District, Sarawak, Malaysia.

Orientation
It is one of four villages, Long Lidung, Long Remirang, Puneng Brayong and Long Tuyo, which are close to Long Sukang, and which co-operate in social and welfare activities.

Other neighbouring settlements include:

References

Lawas District
Villages in Sarawak